Jefferson West USD 340 is a public unified school district headquartered in Meriden, Kansas, United States. It serves the communities of Meriden, Ozawkie, Rock Creek, housing along the west side of Perry Lake, and rural areas.

Administration
The school district is currently under the administration of Superintendent Jason Crawford. Building principals are elementary school principal, Wes Sturgeon, middle school principal, Brenna Dooley, and high school principal, Rhonda Frakes.

Board of education
The Jefferson West Board of Education currently meets on the second Monday of each month at the district office.

Current schools
There are three public schools in the district, all of which are located in Meriden. The current schools are listed below:
 Jefferson West Elementary, K-4
 Jefferson West Middle School, 5-8
 Jefferson West High School, 9-12

Former schools
Jefferson West Intermediate in Ozawkie used to serve grades four and five. At the end of the 2009 school year, the school was closed as a cost-saving measure. Prior to the closing of the school, the school system was as follows:
 Jefferson West Elementary (Meriden), K-3
 Jefferson West Intermediate (Ozawkie), 4-5
 Jefferson West Middle (Meriden), 6-8
 Jefferson West High (Meriden), 9-12

See also
 Kansas State Department of Education
 Kansas State High School Activities Association
 List of high schools in Kansas
 List of unified school districts in Kansas

References

External links
 

Education in Jackson County, Kansas
Education in Jefferson County, Kansas
Education in Shawnee County, Kansas
School districts in Kansas